Lorne Balfe (born 23 February 1976) is a British composer and record producer of film, television, and video game scores. A veteran of Hans Zimmer's Remote Control Productions, Balfe is known for his composing music for big-budget films like 13 Hours: The Secret Soldiers of Benghazi, Terminator Genisys, Mission: Impossible – Fallout, the DreamWorks Animation films Home and Penguins of Madagascar, as well as the video games Assassin's Creed: Revelations, Assassin's Creed III, Crysis 2, Skylanders, the Call of Duty franchise and the new fanfare for Skydance Media, which debuted in The Adam Project. He has also scored the television series The Bible, Marcella, The Crown, and Genius, the latter for which he was nominated for a Primetime Emmy Award for Outstanding Original Main Title Theme Music.

Balfe was born in Inverness, Scotland. He went to Fettes College in Edinburgh, where he had a music scholarship.

Discography

Feature films

As composer of additional music

Documentary films

Short films

Television

Video games

References

External links

Lorne Balfe Interview at www.reviewgraveyard.com
Interview with Lorne Balfe at FilmMusicSite.com
Composing a career of note (Scotsman)

Living people
21st-century British composers
21st-century Scottish male musicians
Animation composers
British film score composers
British male film score composers
DreamWorks Animation people
People educated at Fettes College
People from Inverness
Skydance Media people
Scottish film score composers
Video game composers
1976 births